Cloudcroft Peaks is located in the Lewis Range, Glacier National Park in the U.S. state of Montana.

Climate

Cloudcroft Peaks is located in an alpine subarctic climate zone characterized by long, usually very cold winters, and short, cool to mild summers. Winter temperatures can drop below −10 °F with wind chill factors below −30 °F.

Geology

Like the other mountains in Glacier National Park, Cloudcroft Peaks is composed of sedimentary rock laid down during the Precambrian to Jurassic periods.

Gallery

See also
 Mountains and mountain ranges of Glacier National Park (U.S.)

References

Mountains of Flathead County, Montana
Chapman
Lewis Range